Kazi Nazrul Islam Mahavidyalaya, established in 1981, is the general degree college at Churulia in Asansol, Paschim Bardhaman district. It offers undergraduate courses in arts and commerce. It is affiliated to  Kazi Nazrul University, Asansol.

Departments

Arts and Commerce

Bengali
English
History
Commerce
Geography
Hindi
Political Science
Sanskrit
Philosophy

Accreditation
The college is recognized by the University Grants Commission (UGC).

See also

References

External links
Kazi Nazrul Islam Mahavidyalaya
Kazi Nazrul University
University Grants Commission
National Assessment and Accreditation Council

Universities and colleges in Paschim Bardhaman district
Colleges affiliated to Kazi Nazrul University
Education in Asansol
Educational institutions established in 1981
1981 establishments in West Bengal
Kazi Nazrul Islam